Dibgalik (Dargwa: Дибгалихъ) is a rural locality (a selo) in Guladtynsky Selsoviet, Dakhadayevsky District, Republic of Dagestan, Russia. The population was 554 as of 2010. There are 6 streets.

Geography
Dibgalik is located 6 km southeast of Urkarakh (the district's administrative centre) by road. Buskri and Chishili are the nearest rural localities.

Nationalities 
Dargins live there.

References 

Rural localities in Dakhadayevsky District